Jeff Manookian (November 24, 1953 – July 10, 2021) was an American pianist, composer, and conductor from Salt Lake City, Utah.

Manookian shared 1st prize in the 2017 International Piano Competition of the World Piano Teachers Association. He was a recipient of commissions by the Barlow Endowment of Brigham Young University, the Abramyan String Quartet and the National Endowment for the Arts.

Manookian had been Music Director of the Theatre Orchestra of Tucumán (Argentina), Intermountain Classical Orchestra (Salt Lake City, Utah), University of Utah Summer Arts Orchestra, Westminster Chamber Orchestra (Salt Lake City, Utah), and Artistic Director of the Oratorio Society of Utah (USA).

References

External links
 

1953 births
2021 deaths
American male composers
21st-century American composers
American male conductors (music)
21st-century American conductors (music)
21st-century American male musicians
American people of Armenian descent
Armenian composers
Armenian conductors (music)
Ethnic Armenian composers
Armenian Argentine
Musicians from Salt Lake City